The Chicago Connectory is an incubator co-creation space located in the Merchandise Mart, in Chicago, Illinois in the United States.  It is a partnership between Robert Bosch and 1871, an innovation space located within the same building. Whereas 1871 is open to any digital startup, The Connectory concentrates on the Internet of Things. Areas of interest in that field include Industry 4.0, connected cars, connected home appliances, Smart Cities, and connected construction.

History
The Chicago Connectory Opened in May 2017. It was 1871's first co-creation partnership dedicated to a specific technology area.  It was also the first Connectory for Robert Bosch, which has subsequently founded similar Connectory spaces in Brazil, China, Germany & Mexico.

Partners
Partner Companies provide services and assistance to member companies.  Partners include the Robert Bosch Group, 1871, Lumen Technologies, and Chicago area universities.

Members
Members include IoT-related startups, both Chicago-based as well as international.  In addition to working space, membership at the Chicago Connectory affords:
 Use of a network of mentors managed by the Connectory
 Access to Windy City Labs, a prototyping/consulting facility within the Connectory
 All 1871 membership benefits

Events
The Connectory hosts forums and events that serve to educate the IoT community in new trends, technology, etc. These are accessible to all members, and select events are opened to the public.

References

External links
 Chicago Connectory Home Page

Business incubators of the United States
2017 establishments in Illinois
Startup accelerators
Robert Bosch GmbH
Internet of things companies
Business and industry organizations based in Chicago